Jan Moons (born 26 September 1970) is a Belgian football goalkeeper. He currently plays for C.S. Visé and formerly in the Jupiler League for K.F.C. Germinal Beerschot, K.R.C. Genk and S.K. Lierse.

References

External links
 

1970 births
Belgian footballers
Association football goalkeepers
K.R.C. Genk players
Living people
Beerschot A.C. players
C.S. Visé players